Melissa Anne Lowder (born January 29, 1997) is an American professional soccer player who plays as a goalkeeper for National Women's Soccer League (NWSL) club San Diego Wave FC.

Club career

Utah Royals FC
Lowder made her professional debut on September 26, 2020.

References

External links
 
 NWSL Profile
 Santa Clara profile

Living people
American women's soccer players
Women's association football goalkeepers
Utah Royals FC players
National Women's Soccer League players
Santa Clara Broncos women's soccer players
Soccer players from San Diego
1997 births
Chicago Red Stars players
San Diego Wave FC players